Kineshma, the second-largest town in Ivanovo Oblast in Russia, sprawls for  along the Volga River, 335 kilometers north-east of Moscow. Population:

History
Kineshma was first noticed as a posad in 1429.  In 1504, Ivan III gave it to Prince Feodor Belsky, who escaped to Moscow from Lithuania and married Ivan's niece. Later on, Ivan the Terrible gave Kineshma to Ivan Petrovich Shuisky, but after the latter's death it was returned to the Tsar in 1587. In the 16th and 17th centuries, Kineshma was a major fishing center, which supplied sturgeon for the Tsar's table. In 1608, it was twice ravaged by the Poles. Throughout its history, Kineshma belonged to different Russian regions, including Archangelgorod Governorate, Yaroslavl Province of Saint Petersburg Governorate, and Moscow Governorate.

Etymology
From a substrate Finno-Ugric language (cf.  ('kine', < Proto-Finno-Permic *känз), "hemp").

Administrative and municipal status
Within the framework of administrative divisions, Kineshma serves as the administrative center of Kineshemsky District, even though it is not a part of it. As an administrative division, it is incorporated separately as the Town of Kineshma—an administrative unit with the status equal to that of the districts. As a municipal division, the Town of Kineshma is incorporated as Kineshma Urban Okrug.

Economy
Since the 18th century, the town's main industry has been textile manufacturing. Like all the textile centers in Russia, the town's prosperity declined after the perestroika.

Architecture
Kineshma's principal landmark is the Trinity Cathedral, built in 1838–1845 to a typical Neoclassical design. There are also several 18th-century churches in the town. The neighborhoods of Kineshma contain estates and museums of Alexander Ostrovsky, Alexander Borodin, and Fyodor Bredikhin.

In 2010, Kineshma was granted status of a town of historical significance.

Religion

Currently there are eleven churches, nine of which are active, and three chapels.

People
Alexander Borodin, composer and chemist
Fyodor Bredikhin, astronomer
Sergey Klyugin, Olympic high jumper
Alexander Ostrovsky, writer
Andrei Semenov, mixed martial artist
Kostromin, musical artist

Twin towns – sister cities

Kineshma is twinned with:
 Vantaa, Finland 
 Baranavichy, Belarus
 Gudauta, Abkhazia

See also
Kineshma Bridge
Dmitrievsky Chemical Plant

References

Notes

Sources

External links
Official website of Kineshma 
168 chasov, city news

Cities and towns in Ivanovo Oblast
Kineshemsky Uyezd
Populated places on the Volga